Nonpartisan elections are currently held every four years to elect the mayor of Madison, Wisconsin.

Elections before 1997

1997 (special)

The 1997 Madison mayoral special election was held February 17 and April 1, 1997 to elect the mayor of Madison, Wisconsin. It was held after the resignation of incumbent mayor Paul Soglin. It saw the election of Susan J. M. Bauman.

Candidates
Ray Allen, Madison School Board member
Richard H. Anderson
Susan J. M. Bauman, alderperson on the Madison Common Council
Wayne Bigelow, President of the Madison Common Council
John Hendrick, Supervisor on the Dane County Board since 1994
Mary Lang-Sollinger, community activist and political fundraiser
Tom Neale
David Travis, member of the Wisconsin State Assembly

Results

1999

The 1999 Madison mayoral election was held April 9, 1999 to elect the mayor of Madison, Wisconsin. It saw the reelection of incumbent mayor Susan J. M. Bauman.

Since only two candidates ran, no primary was held.

Results

2003

The 2003 Madison mayoral election was held February 20 and April 4, 2003 to elect the mayor of Madison, Wisconsin. It saw the election of Dave Cieslewicz. Incumbent mayor Susan J. M. Bauman was eliminated in the primary.

Candidates
Susan J. M. Bauman, incumbent mayor
Dave Cieslewicz, former member of the Dane County Board of Supervisors
Davy Mayer
Will Sandstrom
Paul R. Soglin, former mayor
Bert G. Zipperer

Results

2007

The 2007 Madison mayoral election was held February 22 and April 5, 2007 to elect the mayor of Madison, Wisconsin. It saw the reelection of incumbent mayor Dave Cieslewicz.

Candidates
Ray Allen, Madison School Board member and 1997 mayoral candidate
Dave Cieslewicz, incumbent mayor
Peter Munoz
Will Sandstrom, 2003 mayoral candidate

Results

2011

The 2011 Madison mayoral election was held February 20 and April 4, 2003 to elect the mayor of Madison, Wisconsin. It saw former mayor Paul Soglin return to the mayoralty by unseating incumbent mayor Dave Cieslewicz.

Candidates
John Blotz
Dave Cieslewicz, incumbent mayor
Dennis Amadeus de Nure
Nick Hart
Paul R. Soglin, former mayor

Results

2015

The 2015 Madison mayoral election was held February 17 and April 7, 2015 to elect the mayor of Madison, Wisconsin. It saw the reelection of incumbent mayor Paul Soglin.

Candidates
Richard V. Brown, Sr. 
Christopher Daly
Bridget Maniaci former 2nd district member of the Madison Common Council (2009–2013)
Scott Resnick, 8th district member of the Madison Common Council since 2011 and tech executive
Paul Soglin, incumbent mayor

Results

2019

The 2019 Madison mayoral election was held February 19 and April 2, 2019 to elect the mayor of Madison, Wisconsin. It saw the election of Satya Rhodes-Conway, who unseated incumbent mayor Paul Soglin. Conway became the second woman and the first openly-gay individual elected mayor in the city's history.

Candidates
Maurice "Mo" Cheeks, 10th district member of the Madison Common Council since 2013 and Vice President of Business Development at MIOsoft
Satya Rhodes-Conway, former 12th district member of the Madison Common Council
Nick Hart
Raj Shukla
Paul Soglin, incumbent mayor

Results

2023 

The 2023 Madison mayoral election will be held April 4, 2023 to elect the mayor of Madison, Wisconsin. 

A primary election was held on February 21, 2023 to narrow down the candidates to two. It saw record turnout due to the concurrent primary for the 2023 Wisconsin Supreme Court election. Satya Rhodes-Conway and Gloria Reyes qualified for the general election, while Scott Kerr was eliminated. Daniel Howell Jr., a write-in candidate, plans on running as a write-in candidate for the general election in addition to the primary.

Candidates
Daniel Howell Jr., caseworker and former Wisconsin Badgers football player (write-in)
Scott Kerr, traffic engineer
Gloria Reyes, former deputy mayor and president of the Madison Board of Education
Satya Rhodes-Conway, incumbent mayor

Forums

Results

Notes

References

External links 
Official campaign websites 
 Satya Rhodes-Conway for Mayor
 Gloria Reyes for Mayor